Gaulbert Evans (born 12 May 1965) is a former West Indian cricketer. Evans' batting and bowling styles are unknown.

In February 2008, the United States Virgin Islands were invited to take part in the 2008 Stanford 20/20, whose matches held official Twenty20 status. Evans made a single appearance for the United States Virgin Islands in their first-round match against Antigua and Barbuda, with their opponents winning the match by 24 runs. He made a single run in the match, before being dismissed by Carl Simon.

References

External links
Gaulbert Evans at ESPNcricinfo
Gaulbert Evans at CricketArchive

1965 births
Living people
United States Virgin Islands cricketers